Monstera florescanoana is a flowering plant in genus Monstera and family Araceae.

Distribution 
It is native to Mexico (Veracruz).

References 

florescanoana
Flora of Mexico